Akçay (literally "white stream" in Turkish) may refer to the following places:

 Akçay, Bismil
 Akçay, Edremit, a municipality in the district of Edremit, Balıkesir Province, Turkey
 Akçay, Elmalı, a village in the district of Elmalı, Antalya Province, Turkey
 Akçay, İnebolu, a village in the district of İnebolu, Kastamonu Province, Turkey
 Akçay, Güzelyurt, a village in the district of Güzelyurt, northern Cyprus